John Cairney (born 16 February 1930) is a Scottish stage, film and television actor who is well known to audiences in Scotland and internationally through his one-man shows on Robert Burns, Robert Louis Stevenson, Robert Service, Charles Rennie Mackintosh and William McGonagall.

He has worked as an actor, recitalist, lecturer, director and theatre consultant. He is also a published author and an exhibited painter. Trained at the Royal Scottish Academy of Music and Drama, he was a notable Hamlet at the Citizens' Theatre in Glasgow and a successful Macbeth at the Edinburgh International Festival. He played King Humanity in Tyrone Guthrie's Festival production of Sir David Lyndsey's Ane Satyre of the Thrie Estaitis in 1959. In 1962 he joined the Edinburgh Gateway Company, playing James Boswell in Robert McLellan's Young Auchinleck. He was  'This Man Craig' on television, while his many films include Lucky Jim, A Night to Remember, Operation Bullshine, The Flesh and the Fiends, Victim, Cleopatra and Jason and the Argonauts.

He gained a PhD from Victoria University, Wellington, New Zealand and is much in demand internationally as a lecturer, writer and consultant on Robert Louis Stevenson, Charles Rennie Mackintosh and Robert Burns.

Cairney has written books on many famous Scots as well as other books on football (particularly Celtic F.C.), theatre and his native Glasgow, where he now lives with his New Zealand-born wife, actress and scriptwriter Alannah O'Sullivan.

He is married to actress and playwright Alannah O'Sullivan. He is the brother of footballer Jim Cairney. They were raised in the Parkhead area of Glasgow; the referee Tiny Wharton was a childhood acquaintance.

Filmography

References

External links

Official website

Amazon author profile

1930 births
Male actors from Glasgow
Scottish male film actors
Scottish male television actors
Living people
Parkhead